Botzaris is a station on Line 7bis of the Paris Métro. Located in the 19th arrondissement, it was named after Markos Botsaris, a hero of the Greek War of Independence. East of this station, line 7bis becomes a unidirectional loop.

History
The station opened on 18 January 1911 as part of a branch of line 7 from Louis Blanc to Pré-Saint-Gervais, 18 days after the commissioning of the first section of line 7 between Opéra and Porte de la Villette due to difficulties during its construction. As the station is built in a backfilled quarry, it was constructed with arches over each of the tracks to strengthen the station box. On 3 December 1967 this branch was separated from line 7, becoming line 7bis.

As part of the "Un métro + beau" programme by the RATP, the station was renovated and modernised on 25 April 2003.

On 12 February 2016, the Guimard entrance on rue Botzaris was listed as a historical monument.

In 2019, the station was used by 993,450  passengers, making it the 292th busiest of the Métro network out of 302 stations.

In 2020, the station was used by 511,339 passengers amidst the COVID-19 pandemic, making it the 290th busiest of the Métro network out of 305 stations.

Passenger services

Access 
The station has a single Guimard entrance at rue Botzaris leading to the right of the south-eastern end of Parc des Buttes-Chaumont,

Station layout

Platforms 
Botzaris has a standard configuration with 2 tracks surrounded by 2 side platforms. A central wall exists between the tracks to better suit the geological constraints of the terrain and to strengthen the station box.

Other connections 
The station is also served by lines 48, 60, and 71 of the RATP bus network.

Gallery

References

Roland, Gérard (2003). Stations de métro. D’Abbesses à Wagram. Éditions Bonneton.

Paris Métro line 7bis
Paris Métro stations in the 19th arrondissement of Paris
Railway stations in France opened in 1911